The 2021–22 Ukrainian Premier League Youth season are competitions between the youth teams of the Ukrainian Premier League.

Teams

League table

Top scorers

Source: Ukrainian Premier League website

See also
 2021–22 Ukrainian Premier League

References

Reserves
Ukrainian Premier Reserve League seasons
Sports events affected by the 2022 Russian invasion of Ukraine